"Believe It" is a song by the Canadian singer PartyNextDoor and Barbadian singer Rihanna. It was released as the fourth single from PartyNextDoor's third studio album Partymobile on March 27, 2020, and was produced by Bizness Boi, Cardiak and Ninetyfour. The song marks Rihanna's first appearance on a single in three years, following N.E.R.D.'s "Lemon" (2017). The song debuted at number 12 on the UK Singles Chart and at number 23 on the Billboard Hot 100.

Background
PartyNextDoor has previously co-written several songs with Rihanna, including "Work", "Sex with Me" and "Wild Thoughts".

Writing and recording
American record producer Cardiak created the instrumental of the song, which features "intertwining guitar and [a] pitched-up vocal sample". He then sent it to his co-producer Bizness Boi, who was at a writing camp in Paris; despite working on the track with an unnamed artist, he passed it on to Ninetyfour, who fleshed the song out and sent it to PartyNextDoor upon the advice of a friend. PartyNextDoor put placeholder vocals from his girlfriend on the track while waiting to hear back from Rihanna. Rihanna finished her vocals in the week of the album's release. Bizness Boi and Ninetyfour did not hear Rihanna's finished vocals on the track until the album's release on March 27.

Lyrics and composition
"Believe It" is a "sensual" R&B "slow burner" about a relationship, with PartyNextDoor and Rihanna singing to each other as lovers "imploring each other to believe in the power of their connection".

Critical reception
Jessica McKinney of Complex included the song among their list of Best New Music of the week, calling it a "breezy R&B record" and noting how Rihanna takes a backseat to Party, "only offering raspy vocals on the chorus", singing, "Best make me believe it/Believe you won't deceive me".

Charts

Weekly charts

Year-end charts

Certifications

Release history

References

2020 singles
2020 songs
PartyNextDoor songs
Rihanna songs
Songs written by Cardiak
Songs written by PartyNextDoor
Songs written by Rihanna